Queen Elizabeth Driveway is a scenic parkway in Ottawa, Canada, that runs along the western edge of the Rideau Canal. It runs from Laurier Avenue in the north to Dow's Lake where it turns into Prince of Wales Drive. It is administered and owned by the National Capital Commission (NCC).

The drive was one of the first projects of the NCC.  The NCC replaced the Federal District Commission (FDC), which had been created in 1927, and the even earlier Ottawa Improvement Commission. The two-lane road replaced the industrial buildings and private boathouses that had stood along the canal. The drive was lined with trees and gardens, and a series of large houses were built along it. It was originally known as the Government Driveway but was soon renamed the Rideau Canal Driveway. Several decades later it was given its current name. The speed limit for most of its length is 60 km/h (37 mph).

In the 1950s a similar route was created on the eastern edge of the canal, the Colonel By Drive.

Along the entire length of the Drive is a multi-use trail  as part of the Capital Pathway system.

References

Roads in Ottawa
Parkways in Ontario
National Capital Commission